Bunker Hill Township (T7N R8W) is located in Macoupin County, Illinois, United States. As of the 2010 census, its population is 3,227 and it contains 10,387 housing units

Geography

Demographics

Adjacent townships
 Hillyard Township (north)
 Gillespie Township (northeast)
 Dorchester Township (east)
 Omphghent Township, Madison County (southeast)
 Moro Township, Madison County (south)
 Brighton Township (west)
 Shipman Township (northwest)

References

External links
City-data.com
Illinois State Archives

Townships in Macoupin County, Illinois
Townships in Illinois